The Monument to Freedom and Unity is a planned national German monument in Berlin commemorating the country's peaceful reunification in 1990 and earlier 18th, 19th and 20th century unification movements.

It was agreed on 9 November 2007 by a decree of the Bundestag. The decree proposed the site of the former National Kaiser Wilhelm Monument on the Schlossfreiheit for the new structure, next to the Berlin Palace containing the Humboldt Forum which was rebuilt between 2013-2020. The monument will feature the slogans "Wir sind das Volk, Wir sind ein Volk" (in English: ‘We are the people, We are one people’), . This is a reference to the chants “Wir sind das Volk” adopted during the Monday demonstrations in 1989 and “Wir sind ein Volk” adopted by advocates of German reunification in 1990.  

In early June 2017, the Bundestag decided to start construction of the memorial in front of the City Palace according to the design of Milla & Partner. It was to be inaugurated on the 30th anniversary of the fall of the Berlin Wall on 9 November 2019. However, construction began on 19 May 2020. The Federal Office for Building and Regional Planning (de) expects completion of constructions in 2023.

References

Monuments and memorials in Berlin
German reunification